Helleborus argutifolius, the holly-leaved hellebore, or Corsican hellebore, syn. H. corsicus, H. lividus subsp. corsicus is a species of flowering plant in the family Ranunculaceae, native to Corsica and Sardinia.

The Latin specific epithet argutifolius means “with sharp-toothed leaves” . 

In cultivation Helleborus argutifolius hybridises readily with the closely related H. lividus. H. argutifolius has gained the Royal Horticultural Society's Award of Garden Merit.

References

argutifolius
Flora of Italy